Longwood is a historic home and farm located near Earlysville, Albemarle County, Virginia. The house was built about 1790, with additions between 1810 and 1820, and about 1940.  It is a two-story, five-bay frame building with a two-story store/post office addition and a small one-story, two bay, gable-roofed frame wing.  It has Federal and Colonial Revival design elements.  Also on the property are a contributing frame barn (c. 1890), a frame schoolhouse for African American students [c. 1900), a late-19th-century stone well, and the 19th-century cemetery of the Michie family.

It was added to the National Register of Historic Places in 1996.

References

Houses on the National Register of Historic Places in Virginia
Federal architecture in Virginia
Colonial Revival architecture in Virginia
Houses completed in 1790
Houses in Albemarle County, Virginia
National Register of Historic Places in Albemarle County, Virginia